Marrybrown Sdn Bhd (doing business as Marrybrown) is a Malaysian-owned multinational chain of quick service restaurants originated in Johor Bahru, Johor, Malaysia. Being one of the largest global halal fast food-establishments, the chain has since expanded to over 500 locations throughout Malaysia and across 15 countries. The restaurant focuses on Malaysian and western dishes.

History

Early beginnings
Marrybrown was founded in 1981 by Lawrence Liew and Nancy Liew in Johor Bahru, Johor, Malaysia. As the banks are reluctant to provide the pair with a personal loan, the couple raised RM120,000.00 via their personal joint savings as well as by borrowing funds from their relatives and close friends.  The couple faced many challengers and obstacles to open their first outlet — as many of the shop owners are reluctant to lease their premise, while suppliers are only willing to provide their goods on a cash delivery services.

The first restaurant was opened in 1981 from a small shop lot in Jalan Wong Ah Fook, Johor Bahru. The couple named their restaurant as "Marrybrown", three-syllable name, as it was perceived that the simple name has an international-concept, easy to pronounced and remembered. The three-syllable name is also common in the fast-food industry, as can be seen in KFC, McDonald's, Burger King and A&W.

Domestic and international growth
After Marrybrown moved into franchising module in 1985, the chain began to experienced rapid growth; currently its franchise outlets formed a majority of its operation.  After tapping the Malaysian market, the restaurant operated its first overseas branch in China by 1996. The company's local and abroad expansions were assisted by its halal-friendly approach as well as its incorporation of Malaysian menu, which were both managed to appeal many international consumers. 

International presence of Marrybrown franchises by year (including both former and currently operated countries) cosist of the following:'''

 Malaysia – 1981
 Singapore – 1990, 1995
 Brunei - 1990, 2014
 China – 1996
 India – 1999
 Sri Lanka – 1999
 Bahrain – 2000
 Kuwait – 2000
 Qatar – 2000
 Saudi Arabia – 2000
 United Arab Emirates – 2000
 Syria – 2005
 Tanzania – 2008
 Azerbaijan – 2009
 Maldives – 2011
 Indonesia - 2012
 Myanmar – 2013
 Thailand – 2015
 Sweden – 2020

Menu and concept
To differentiate from the other early quick service restaurant in Malaysia that largely based on the American-menu — such as fried chicken and burgers, the restaurant began to introduced and combined Malaysian flavours to compliment the western-meals offered in the restaurant. It was the first Malaysian fast-food restaurants that included rice, with the introduction of Nasi Marrybrown in 1986, followed by Nasi Lemak in 1989, Chicken Porridge in 1990 and Curry Noodles in 2006. The chain's menu also features Chicken rice, Bubur pedas, Nasi Kandar, fried bread, fish and chips, cheesy potato wedges, mashed potatoes and other beverages. 

In addition to the Malaysian and western cuisines, the chain would also introduced regionalised meals in its international locations. In the Indian Ocean nation of Maldives, the Marrybrown outlets in the country would include Tuna Burger and Curry Tuna Biryani; in India, 30% of its items would be tailored in accordance to the localised vegetarian selections. In UAE, wrap, pasta and spicy rice included in the menu; while churros and mozzarella sticks are served in Marrybrown's Swedish outlet; and in its Tanzanian branch, wrap and veggie burger meals are available.

Gallery

External links

References 

1981 establishments in Malaysia
Restaurants in Malaysia
Fast-food franchises
Fast-food poultry restaurants
Privately held companies of Malaysia
Malaysian cuisine
Malaysian brands
Restaurants established in 1981
Malaysian companies established in 1981
Johor Bahru